Cecilia "Cipe" Lincovsky (21 September 1929 – 31 August 2015) was an Argentine actress.

She made her stage debut in 1953, and joined the Berliner Ensemble in 1960. Lincovsky spent much of her career overseas, including in Venezuela and France, as she had drawn attention from Argentine Anticommunist Alliance. Returning to Argentina via Spain in the 1980s, Lincovsky joined the Argentine Open Theatre. She was awarded the Silver Condor Award for Best Actress in 1990.

She died of cardiac arrest and kidney failure in her hometown of Buenos Aires on 31 August 2015, aged 85. Lincovsky was buried in La Chacarita cemetery the next day.

Selected filmography
Quebracho (1974)
The Truce (1974)
Poor Butterfly (1986)
Apartment Zero (1988)
The Girlfriend (1988)
The Two Waters (1988)
Naked Tango (1991)
Wild Horses (1995)
A Love in Moisés Ville (2001)
The German Friend (2012)

References

External links

1929 births
2015 deaths
Deaths from kidney failure
20th-century Argentine actresses
21st-century Argentine actresses
Argentine stage actresses
Argentine film actresses
Argentine television actresses
Actresses from Buenos Aires
Argentine expatriates in France
Argentine expatriates in Venezuela
Argentine expatriates in Spain
Argentine expatriates in Germany
Jewish Argentine actresses
Burials at La Chacarita Cemetery